The discography of Yumi Matsutoya, a Japanese singer-songwriter, consists of thirty-nine studio albums and EPs, forty-one singles, two live albums, and several compilation albums. It also denotes her early four albums and seven singles that were released under her maiden name Yumi Arai.

Albums

Studio albums
As Yumi Arai

As Yumi Matsutoya
{| class="wikitable plainrowheaders" style="text-align:center;"
|-
! rowspan="2"|Year
! rowspan="2"|Title
! rowspan="2"|Details
!colspan="1"|Peak chart positions
|-
! style="width:3em;font-size:85%"| JPN
|-
|rowspan="2"|1978
! scope="row" |
|align="left"|
Released: March 5, 1978
Label: Toshiba EMI/Express
|2
|-
! scope="row" |
|align="left"|
Released: November 5, 1978
Label: Toshiba EMI/Express
|4
|-
|rowspan="2"|1979
! scope="row" |Olive
|align="left"|
Released: July 20, 1979
Label: Toshiba EMI/Express
|5
|-
! scope="row" |
|align="left"|
Released: December 1, 1979
Label: Toshiba EMI/Express
|6
|-
|rowspan="2"|1980
! scope="row" |
|align="left"|
Released: June 21, 1980
Label: Toshiba EMI/Express
|3
|-
! scope="row" |Surf & Snow
|align="left"|
Released: December 1, 1980
Label: Toshiba EMI/Express
|7
|-
|rowspan="2"|1981
! scope="row" |
|align="left"|
EP
Released: May 21, 1981
Label: Toshiba EMI/Express
|9
|-
! scope="row" |
|align="left"|
Released: November 1, 1981
Label: Toshiba EMI/Express
|1
|-
|1982
! scope="row" |Pearl Pierce
|align="left"|
Released: June 21, 1982
Label: Toshiba EMI/Express
|1
|-
|rowspan="2"|1983
! scope="row" |Reincarnation
|align="left"|
Released: February 21, 1983
Label: Toshiba EMI/Express
|1
|-
! scope="row" |Voyager
|align="left"|
Released: December 1, 1983
Label: Toshiba EMI/Express
|1
|-
|1984
! scope="row" |No Side
|align="left"|
Released: December 1, 1984
Label: Toshiba EMI/Express
|1
|-
|1985
! scope="row" |Da-Di-Da
|align="left"|
Released: November 30, 1985
Label: Toshiba EMI/Express
|1
|-
|1986
! scope="row" |Alarm à la mode
|align="left"|
Released: November 29, 1986
Label: Toshiba EMI/Express
|1
|-
|1987
! scope="row" |Before the Diamond Dust Fades...
|align="left"|
Released: December 5, 1987
Label: Toshiba EMI/Express
|1
|-
|1988
! scope="row" |Delight Slight Light Kiss
|align="left"|
Released: November 26, 1988
Label: Toshiba EMI/Express
|1
|-
|1989
! scope="row" |Love Wars
|align="left"|
Released: November 25, 1989
Label: Toshiba EMI/Express
RIAJ Certification: Million
|1
|-
|1990
! scope="row" |
|align="left"|
Released: November 23, 1990
Label: Toshiba EMI/Express
RIAJ Certification: 2× Million
|1
|-
|1991
! scope="row" |Dawn Purple
|align="left"|
Released: November 22, 1991
Label: Toshiba EMI/Express
RIAJ Certification: 2× Million
|1
|-
|1992
! scope="row" |Tears and Reasons
|align="left"|
Released: November 27, 1992
Label: Toshiba EMI/Express
RIAJ Certification: Million
|1
|-
|1993
! scope="row" |U-miz
|align="left"|
Released: November 26, 1993
Label: Toshiba EMI/Express
RIAJ Certification: Million
|1
|-
|1994
! scope="row" |The Dancing Sun
|align="left"|
Released: November 25, 1994
Label: Toshiba EMI/Express
RIAJ Certification: 2× Million
|1
|-
|1995
! scope="row" |Kathmandu
|align="left"|
Released: December 1, 1995
Label: Toshiba EMI/Express
RIAJ Certification: Million
|1
|-
|rowspan="2"|1997
! scope="row" |Cowgirl Dreamin'''
|align="left"|
Released: February 28, 1997
Label: Toshiba EMI/Express
RIAJ Certification: Million
IFPI HK Certification: Gold 
|1
|-
! scope="row" |
|align="left"|
Released: December 5, 1997
Label: Toshiba EMI/Express
|2
|-
|1999
! scope="row" |Frozen Roses|align="left"|
Released: November 17, 1999
Label: Toshiba EMI/Express
|3
|-
|2001
! scope="row" |Acacia|align="left"|
Released: June 6, 2001
Label: Toshiba EMI/Express
|2
|-
|2002
! scope="row" |Wings of Winter, Shades of Summer|align="left"|
Released: November 20, 2002
Label: Toshiba EMI/Capitol
RIAJ Certification: Gold
|2
|-
|2004
! scope="row" |Viva 6×7|align="left"|
Released: November 10, 2004
Label: Toshiba EMI/Capitol
RIAJ Certification: Gold
|5
|-
|2006
! scope="row" |A Girl in Summer|align="left"|
Released: May 24, 2006
Label: Toshiba EMI/Capitol
RIAJ Certification: Gold
|3
|-
|2009
! scope="row" |And I Will Dream Again|align="left"|
Released: April 8, 2009
Label: EMI Music Japan/Capitol
RIAJ Certification: Gold
|4
|-
|2011
! scope="row" |Road Show|align="left"|
Released: April 6, 2011
Label: EMI Music Japan/Capitol
RIAJ Certification: Gold
|2
|-
|2013
! scope="row" |POP CLASSICO|align="left"|
Released: November 20, 2013
Label: EMI Music Japan/Capitol
RIAJ Certification: Gold
|2
|-
|2016
! scope="row" |
|align="left"|
Released: November 2, 2016
Label: EMI Music Japan/Capitol
|1
|-
|}

Live albums

Compilation albums
Before the artist purchased all the rights of her early songs in 2000, Yumi Arai's former publishing company Alfa Music, which had evolved into a full-fledged record label in 1977, had issued over half a dozen of unauthorized compilation albums (they had the ancillary rights for her material at the time). In addition, EMI Music Japan also released a piles of budget-priced compilations on audio cassettes during the 1970s and the early 1980s.

Following materials are the official retrospective albums:  Yuming Brand Part I, Album, Super Best of Yumi Arai, Neue Musik, Sweet, bittersweet, The Greatest Hits, Seasons Colours, and The Best of Yumi Matsutoya 40th Anniversary''.
as Yumi Arai

as Yumi Matsutoya

Singles
As Yumi Arai

As Yumi Matsutoya

As featured artist

References

Discographies of Japanese artists
Pop music discographies